Pedro Proença Oliveira Alves Garcia (born 3 November 1970) is a retired Portuguese football referee.

Proença has refereed a number of notable matches including the Supertaça Cândido de Oliveira, Taça de Portugal finals, Taça da Liga finals, as well as the final of both the UEFA Champions League and UEFA European Championship becoming the first referee to overview both finals of the main European competitions for clubs and national teams in the same year.

In 2006–07, he was named as the Portuguese Referee of the Year. He was promoted to UEFA's Elite category at the start of the 2009–10 season. On 22 June 2011, he was named as "Best Referee" for the 2010–11 season by the Portuguese Football Federation. In January 2013, he was voted by the IFFHS as the Best Referee of 2012. Proença retired from refereeing in January 2015.

In July 2015, six months after retiring from refereeing, he announced his candidature and was subsequently elected president of the Portuguese Professional Football League.

Career
Proença has refereed in the Portuguese Liga since 1998, being promoted to the FIFA international referee list in 2003.

On 10 August 2003, he officiated the Supertaça Cândido de Oliveira, his first final in Portuguese competitions. The match took place at Estádio D. Afonso Henriques, and opposed Porto and Leiria. A year later, he took charge of three matches at the 2004 UEFA Under-19 Championships, including the final between Turkey and Spain.

In December 2004, he officiated his first UEFA Cup match, the second leg of the first round tie between AEK Athens and Gorica. He was appointed to lead the 2007 Taça de Portugal Final, in a match opposing Sporting and Belenenses. Sporting eventually won with Liédson scoring the only goal of the match.

After refereeing qualifying matches in the previous two seasons, he refereed his first UEFA Champions League group stage match in September 2007, a 2–1 win for PSV Eindhoven over CSKA Moscow.

On 22 March 2008, he had the honor of refereeing the first final of Taça da Liga. The final was played at the Estádio Algarve in Faro between Vitória de Setúbal and Sporting Clube de Portugal. Vitória de Setúbal won 3–2 on penalties after a 0–0 draw. He cautioned three players, Sandro of Vitória de Setúbal, Polga and Miguel Veloso of Sporting. He was announced as the referee for the 2010 Taça de Portugal Final between Chaves and Porto (2–1). Ricardo Rocha and Bruno Alves were sent off for accumulation of yellow cards. He was elected to the 2011 Taça da Liga Final. The match was played by Paços de Ferreira, who had beaten Nacional 3–4 in their semi-final, and the title holders Benfica who had beaten their rivals Sporting 4–1 in their semi-final. Benfica went on to win 2–1 to take their fourth Taça da Liga in a row.

In summer of 2011, he was victim of an attack on his person at Colombo Centre, in Lisbon. He was struck with head in face by an individual, losing two teeth and suffered injuries to mouth.

On 13 May 2012, he was chosen to referee the 2012 UEFA Champions League Final, between Chelsea and Bayern Munich. On 20 December 2011, he was named one of the 12 referees selected by UEFA to take charge of games at UEFA Euro 2012. He was in charge of the Group C fixture between Spain and Republic of Ireland on 10 June 2012, Group D fixture between Sweden and France on 19 June 2012 and the quarter-final between England and Italy on 24 June 2012. A particular incident occurred in the match between Spain and the Republic of Ireland, in which he pushed Keith Andrews over by accident. On 29 June 2012, UEFA announced that he would referee the final between the Spain and Italy, thus becoming the first Portuguese to referee a European Championship final. Like Howard Webb, who refereed the 2010 FIFA World Cup Final, he also refereed the Champions League final in the same year as taking charge of the final of a major international tournament. He has been selected by FIFA to participate in the 2014 FIFA World Cup in Brazil.

On 22 January 2015, Proença announced his retirement from refereeing.

Administrative roles
On 3 July 2015, he was elected for the UEFA Referees Committee. Later that month, on 28 July, he was elected the new president of the Professional Football League.

References

External links
Pedro Proença profile on WorldReferee.com
Characteristics as referee on worldfootball.com

1970 births
Living people
Sportspeople from Lisbon
Portuguese football referees
UEFA Champions League referees
2014 FIFA World Cup referees
UEFA Euro 2012 referees
UEFA European Championship final referees